Moon Sung-Hyun (Hangul: 문성현) (born November 9, 1991, in Seoul) is a South Korean pitcher who plays for the Kiwoom Heroes in the KBO League. He bats and throws right-handed.

Amateur career
Moon attended Choongam High School in Seoul. In , he had the best high school season, posting a 1.13 ERA and allowing only 8 earned runs in 63 innings pitched. In April, Moon led his team to win the 2009 Golden Lion Flag National Championship, hurling 7.2 shutout innings in the final game, and was named MVP of the tournament. In June, Moon was selected as a member of the South Korean U-18 national team for the Asian Junior Baseball Championship held in Seoul, South Korea. In the championship, he had an excellent performance, going 2–0 with a 0.77 ERA and allowing only 7 hits in 11.2 innings while striking out 16. Team Korea eventually won their third Asian championship and Moon won the MVP honors.

Notable international careers

Professional career
Moon made himself eligible for the 2010 KBO Draft and was selected as the 31st overall pick in the draft by the Nexen Heroes.

Moon started the 2010 season in the reserve league, but was called up in early May. He made his pro league debut on May 8 against the Hanwha Eagles at Mokdong Baseball Stadium, coming from the bullpen and tossing one scoreless inning of one-hit ball. In June, Moon was promoted into the Heroes' starting rotation.

He almost got involved in a match-fixing scandal, but refused and voluntarily reported it. On the other hand, Kim Sung-hyun, who was once on the same team, was found guilty of match fixing when he was with the Nexen Heroes, but was released after he was found to have hidden the fact and moved to the LG Twins. He returned to Kagoshima Training Center without any problems after returning from Kagoshima, Japan, as a witness.

References

External links 
 KBO League career statistics from Koreabaseball.com

South Korean baseball players
Kiwoom Heroes players
KBO League pitchers
1991 births
Living people
Sportspeople from Seoul